= Robles v. Domino's Pizza =

US court case

- Decided: June 6, 2022

Robles v. Domino's Pizza Robles v. Domino's Pizza was a United States court case concerning the Americans with Disabilities Act of 1990.

The two parties settled on June 6, 2022.
